Beryozovo is a rural locality (a selo) in Beryozovskoye Rural Settlement, Podgorensky District, Voronezh Oblast, Russia. The population was 369 as of 2010. There are 8 streets.

Geography 
Beryozovo is located 30 km north of Podgorensky (the district's administrative centre) by road. Saguny is the nearest rural locality.

References 

Rural localities in Podgorensky District